Rotem Keller (born 9 November 2002) is an Israeli professional footballer who plays as a center-back for Israeli Premier League club Hapoel Hadera on loan from Maccabi Netanya.

Club career 
Keller started his career in the Hapoel Hadera's children team and when he was 10 moved to Maccabi Netanya. On 15 June 2022 Keller made his senior debut with at the 1–3 loss against Bnei Yehuda at the Israeli Premier League.

On 2 February 2022 loaned to the Nemzeti Bajnokság I club Diósgyőr until the end of the season.

Career statistics

Club

References

External links 
 

2002 births
Living people
Israeli footballers
Maccabi Netanya F.C. players
Diósgyőri VTK players
Hapoel Hadera F.C. players
Israeli Premier League players
Nemzeti Bajnokság I players
Footballers from Hadera
Israeli expatriate footballers
Expatriate footballers in Hungary
Israeli expatriate sportspeople in Hungary
Israel youth international footballers
Association football defenders